Waldeck (also known as Pageant or Wheat Centre) is an unincorporated community in Vulcan County, Alberta, Canada. Waldeck has suffered from depopulation since the mid-1920s and very little remains of the original townsite. However, many cabins and recreation homes have recently been built along the lake at the site.

The community was named by the Canadian Pacific Railway.

See also 
 List of communities in Alberta

Vulcan County